The Blue Envelope Mystery is a lost 1916 silent film drama  directed by Wilfrid North and starring Lillian Walker. It was produced by the Vitagraph Company of America. Future star Adolphe Menjou has one of his earliest appearances in the film.

Cast
Lillian Walker - Leslie Brennan
John Drew Bennett - Ewen Kennedy (*John D. Bennet)
Bob Hay - Harry Heath
Charles Kent - Uncle Bob
Josephine Earle - Miss Lacy
Harry Northrup - Fischer
Florence Radinoff - Mrs. Davis
Isabel West - Mrs. Harris (*Isabelle West)
William Shea - George
Adolphe Menjou - bit part

References

External links
The Blue Envelope Mystery at IMDb.com

1916 films
American silent feature films
American black-and-white films
Films directed by Wilfrid North
Silent American drama films
1916 drama films
Lost American films
1916 lost films
Lost drama films
1910s American films
1910s English-language films